Will Ropp is an American actor. He first gained attention for his role as Kenny Dawes in The Way Back (2020).

Life and career
Will was born in Connecticut. After graduating from The Bolles School in Jacksonville, Florida, he went on to earn a Bachelor of Fine Arts degree at the University of Michigan. In 2020, He received his breakthrough role as Kenny Dawes on the sports drama film The Way Back by Warner Bros. Pictures. He next appeared in the 2021 releases Silk Road and The Fallout.

Filmography

Film

Television

References

External links
 

Living people
21st-century American male actors
American male film actors
American male television actors
Male actors from Connecticut
University of Michigan alumni
1994 births